Mel & Sue is a British chat show presented by Mel Giedroyc and Sue Perkins. The series was broadcast live on ITV between 12 January 2015 and 22 February 2015. On 11 August 2015, ITV announced that Mel & Sue had been cancelled after one series.

Episodes

Regular episodes

Compilations

 Giedroyc presented the episode alone as Perkins was absent due to illness.

Reception 
The show received mixed reviews from critics, with the Telegraph commenting that the show had had "teething troubles", stating that technical glitches and badly angled cameras affected the show's professionalism. The Telegraph only gave the show 2/5 stars, but stated that it had room for improvement, and did praise the hosts for their "genuine friendship and natural rapport on-screen".

References

External links

2015 British television series debuts
2010s British television talk shows
English-language television shows
ITV talk shows
British live television series
2015 British television series endings